Charles Horatio Everett (March 22, 1855July 5, 1947) was an American farmer, agricultural leader, and Republican politician from the U.S. state of Wisconsin.  He was a member of the Wisconsin Senate (1915 & 1917)  and State Assembly (1913), representing Racine County.

Biography
Everett was born on March 22, 1855, in Turtle, Wisconsin, in Rock County.  He was raised and educated at the common schools in Rock County, becoming a successful farmer and livestock breeder.  

In 1895, he moved to Racine, Wisconsin, where he became the editor of the Wisconsin Agriculturist—a business magazine catering to farmers—and continued in that role for nearly 30 years.  For fifteen years, he also worked as a traveling lecturer for Wisconsin farm interests.  He was the president of the Wisconsin State Dairymen's Association for two terms and was an appointed member of the Wisconsin State Board of Agriculture for decades, serving more than 15 years as secretary.

In 1910, he made his first run for state office when he launched a primary challenge against incumbent state senator Isaac T. Bishop.  He lost by about 800 votes.

Two years later, he ran for Wisconsin State Assembly in Racine County's 1st Assembly district (comprising most of the city of Racine).  He was elected with 47% of the vote in a four-way contest.  In 1914, Isaac Bishop announced he would not run for another term in the State Senate, and Everett then ran to replace him in the 1914 election.  Everett prevailed in the general election with 51% of the vote.

In 1918, rather than running for re-election to the Senate, he ran for Lieutenant Governor of Wisconsin in the Republican primary.  He ran as a ticket with gubernatorial candidate Roy P. Wilcox on a patriotic platform in favor of U.S. participation in World War I.  U.S. participation in the war was highly controversial with Wisconsin's German population, and the Republican incumbents had favored isolationism.  Ultimately Wilcox and Everett fell short in the primary, and Everett did not run for office again.

He died at the age of 92 on July 5, 1947, in Los Angeles, California, but is interred in his home county in Beloit, Wisconsin.

Electoral history

Wisconsin Senate (1910)

| colspan="6" style="text-align:center;background-color: #e9e9e9;"| Republican Primary, September 6, 1910

Wisconsin Assembly (1912)

| colspan="6" style="text-align:center;background-color: #e9e9e9;"| General Election, November 5, 1912

Wisconsin Senate (1914)

| colspan="6" style="text-align:center;background-color: #e9e9e9;"| General Election, November 3, 1914

Wisconsin Lieutenant Governor (1918)

| colspan="6" style="text-align:center;background-color: #e9e9e9;"| Republican Primary, September 3, 1918

References

1855 births
1947 deaths
People from Turtle, Wisconsin
Republican Party Wisconsin state senators
Republican Party members of the Wisconsin State Assembly